Erechthias decoranda is a species of moth in the family Tineidae. It was described by Edward Meyrick in 1925. This species is endemic to New Zealand.

References

External links
Image of type specimen of Erechthias decoranda

Moths described in 1925
Erechthiinae
Moths of New Zealand
Endemic fauna of New Zealand
Taxa named by Edward Meyrick
Endemic moths of New Zealand